Ochraethes nigropunctatus is a species of beetle in the family Cerambycidae. It was described by Chevrolat in 1860.

References

Ochraethes
Beetles described in 1860